Jonnalagadda Venkata Ramana Murthi (20 May 1933 – 22 June 2016) was an Indian actor known for his works in Telugu cinema, and Telugu drama. Murthi made his film debut with K. B. Tilak's sociopolitical film M.L.A. in 1957. Subsequently, he starred in about one fifty feature films in a variety of roles, and has received the Nandi Natakotsavam Award for Life Achievement in theater and drama.

Personal life
He was born on 20 May 1933 in Vizianagaram district, Murthi held a degree in science, Murthi was the younger brother of J. V. Somayajulu.  Before making his foray into theatre and films, Murthi has worked in academics as a senior lecturer.

Theatre
He got the best performance award for Vishwa Shanti of Aatreya in Inter University Competition. He acted in many plays such as N.G.O., Evaru Donga, Kappalu, Natakam, Keerthi Seshulu, Kaala Rathri, Phani and Katamraju Katha and toured the state. His most notable performance is Gireesham in Kanyasulkam of Gurajada Appa Rao. He directed the production and appeared in a record number of performances.

Death
Murthi died on 22 June 2016 due to cardiac arrest in Hyderabad, India.
He was 83 when he died. He was hospitalized.

Selected filmography

References

1933 births
2016 deaths
Male actors from Andhra Pradesh
Indian male stage actors
Telugu male actors
Nandi Award winners
Andhra University alumni
Indian male film actors
Male actors in Tamil cinema
Male actors in Telugu cinema
20th-century Indian male actors
21st-century Indian male actors